Robert John "Bud" Orange (January 3, 1926 – May 6, 2007) was a politician, civil servant and economist from Northwest Territories, Canada. He served briefly with the Royal Navy Fleet Air Arm in 1945. Orange worked at the Dominion Bureau of Statistics.

Robert ran for election to the House of Commons of Canada in the 1965 Canadian federal election for the Liberal Party of Canada and defeated incumbent Eugène Rhéaume.

He was re-elected in the 1968 Canadian federal election and served a second full term in office before retiring from federal politics in 1972. Orange died in 2007 at the age of 81, and was buried in St. Stephen's Cemetery in Old Chelsea, Quebec.

References
 

1926 births
2007 deaths
Members of the House of Commons of Canada from the Northwest Territories
Liberal Party of Canada MPs